Paging Mr. Strike is the second studio album by the Australian alternative rock band Machine Gun Fellatio. The album was released on 26 August 2002 on Festival Mushroom Records. The album debuted at No.6 on the Australian Album Chart in September 2002 and spent a total of 27 weeks in the top 50. The album was certified platinum.

It was re-issued on 7 March 2003 under the title 2nd Page for Mr. Strike, which included an extra disc with eight new tracks. It was also released in the UK in 2003 by Doublethink Recordings, with a new track order and several tracks replaced by ones from the band's debut album, Bring It On!, which was never released internationally.

Track listing

Charts

Weekly charts

Year end charts

Certifications

References

2002 albums
Machine Gun Fellatio albums